Théo Malget (born 2 March 1961) is a Luxembourger retired international footballer who played club football for FC Wiltz 71 and FC Avenir Beggen, as a midfielder.

He is, as of August 2021, assistant coach at Etzella Ettelbruck.

Club career
Malget scored 93 goals in 238 matches for FC Wiltz.

International career
He made his debut for Luxembourg in an April 1982 friendly match against France and earned a total of 47 caps, scoring 3 goals. His final international was an October 1993 World Cup qualification match away against Hungary.

Personal life
Malget's son, Kevin, is also a professional footballer.

References

External links
 

1961 births
Living people
Association football midfielders
Luxembourgian footballers
Luxembourg under-21 international footballers
Luxembourg international footballers
FC Wiltz 71 players
FC Avenir Beggen players
Luxembourg National Division players
Luxembourg Division of Honour players
Luxembourgian expatriate footballers
Expatriate footballers in Germany
Luxembourgian expatriate sportspeople in Germany
Luxembourgian football managers